Miguel Ángel Romero Duarte (born 2 May 1975) is a former Argentine footballer.

External links
 Romero at Football Lineups

1975 births
Living people
Footballers from Buenos Aires
Argentine footballers
Argentine expatriate footballers
Association football midfielders
Club Atlético Tigre footballers
Cobreloa footballers
Colo-Colo footballers
Audax Italiano footballers
Coquimbo Unido footballers
Rangers de Talca footballers
Everton de Viña del Mar footballers
Curicó Unido footballers
Primera B de Chile players
Chilean Primera División players
Expatriate footballers in Chile
Argentine expatriate sportspeople in Chile
Naturalized citizens of Chile
Argentino de Rosario footballers